The 1974 CFL Draft composed of nine rounds where 97 Canadian football players were chosen from eligible Canadian universities and Canadian players playing in the NCAA. A total of 18 players were selected as territorial exemptions. Through trades with the Winnipeg Blue Bombers, the Toronto Argonauts selected first in the first, second, and sixth rounds.

Territorial exemptions
Winnipeg Blue Bombers                         Gordon Paterson  TB  Manitoba

Winnipeg Blue Bombers                             Glen Perrin  TB  Bemidji State

Hamilton Tiger-Cats                           Ted Greaves  WB  Ithaca

Hamilton Tiger-Cats                               Gary Mueller  LB  Wilfrid Laurier

Calgary Stampeders  Murray Anderson  C  Calgary

Calgary Stampeders                                Gordon Yeomans  TB  Washington State

British Columbia Lions  Terry Bailey  TB  Simon Fraser

British Columbia Lions                            Loren Sherbina  DT  Idaho

Toronto Argonauts                             Larry Uteck              DB                    Wilfrid Laurier

Toronto Argonauts                                 Morris Zubkewych         DT                    Simon Fraser

Saskatchewan Roughriders                      Ken McEachern  DB  Weber State

Saskatchewan Roughriders                          Laurie Skolrood  T  North Dakota

Montreal Alouettes                            Gary Chown  LB  Bishop's

Montreal Alouettes                                Gordon Knowlton  TB  Jacksonville State

Edmonton Eskimos                              Dave Fennell            DT                      North Dakota

Edmonton Eskimos  Bill Stevenson  DT  Drake

Ottawa Rough Riders                           Perry Arnold  DB  Western Ontario

Ottawa Rough Riders                               Darryl Craig  T  North Carolina

1st round
1. Toronto Argonauts                              Randy Halsall  T  Wake Forest

2. Hamilton Tiger-Cats  Ken Clark  WR  Saint Mary's

3. Calgary Stampeders                             Henry Janssen          TE                  Western Ontario

4. British Columbia Lions                         Bob Hornes  DB  Idaho State

5. Toronto Argonauts                              Larry Simpson          TE                  Wilfrid Laurier

6. Saskatchewan Roughriders                       Vic McLeod            DE                   Western Ontario

7. Calgary Stampeders                             Fraser MacDonald       LB                  Saint Mary's

8. Ottawa Rough Riders                            Dave Hadden  DB  Queen's

9. Ottawa Rough Riders                            Darryl Craig          T                   North Carolina

2nd round
10. Toronto Argonauts                             Rick Konopka           LB                  Wilfird Laurier

11. Hamilton Tiger-Cats                           Tom Dufault  HB  LaCrosse State

12. Calgary Stampeders                            Morris Cousineau  LB  Windsor

13. British Columbia Lions  Mark Stevenson         DT                  Simon Fraser

14. Edmonton Eskimos                              Al Shemanchuk  DT  Alberta

15. Saskatchewan Roughriders                      Leif Petterson  WR  Otterbein

16. Montreal Alouettes                            Phil Levesque  G  Guelph

17. Hamilton Tiger-Cats                           Andy Currie  DE  Acadia

18. Montreal Alouettes  Bob Petrie             WR                  Western Ontario

3rd round
19. Winnipeg Blue Bombers  Derek Forbes  LB  McMaster

20. Hamilton Tiger-Cats                           Frank Yakimchuk        T                   Saint Mary's

21. Calgary Stampeders                            Brian Hedges  T  Carleton

22. British Columbia Lions                        Andy Jonassen          DE                  Calgary

23. Toronto Argonauts  Bill Baker  DB  British Columbia

24. Saskatchewan Roughriders                      Duncan Findlay  TB  Whitworth

25. Montreal Alouettes                            Michael Fenner  DT Fordham

26. Edmonton Eskimos                              Brian Heiland          TE                  Simon Fraser

27. Ottawa Rough Riders  Bill Robinson          QB                  Saint Mary's

4th round
28. Winnipeg Blue Bombers  David Semple           C                   Simon Fraser

29. Hamilton Tiger-Cats                           Peter McNab           DB                  Queen's

30. Calgary Stampeders                            Donn Sommerfeldt       LB                  Whitworth

31. British Columbia Lions                        Dave Kaduhr            WR                  Simon Fraser

32. Toronto Argonauts                             Wayne Sudsbury  LB  Mount Allison

33. Saskatchewan Rough Riders                      Brian Berg  G  Augsburg

34. Montreal Alouettes  Doug Smith             G                   Wilfrid Laurier

35. Edmonton Eskimos  Peter Quigley  TB  Ottawa

36. British Columbia Lions                        Paul Kliger            LB                  Ottawa

5th round
37. Winnipeg Blue Bombers                         Geoff Sutherland  FB  Waterloo

38. Hamilton Tiger-Cats  Fred McLean            HB                  Wilfrid Laurier

39. Calgary Stampeders                            Len Bzdel  E  Saskatchewan

40. British Columbia Lions                        Joe Pal                DB                   Queen's

41. Toronto Argonauts                             Heinz Brademan         DT                   Alberta

42. Saskatchewan Roughriders                      Bruce Pazarena  DB  Puget Sound

43. Montreal Alouettes  Jim Allen              DT                   Western Ontario

44. Edmonton Eskimos                              Rich Ellert  WR  Minot State

45. Ottawa Rough Riders                           Tom Balfe              DT                   Wilfrid Laurier

6th round
46. Toronto Argonauts  Jay Chapman            DE                   Western Ontario

47. Hamilton Tiger-Cats                           Ralph Corvino          DB                   McMaster

48. Calgary Stampeders                            Steve Fudge            E                    Mount Allison

49. British Columbia Lions                        Herb Page  K  Kent State

50. Toronto Argonauts                             John Dionisi           WR                   Acadia

51. Saskatchewan Roughriders                      Vance Curtis           TE                   Alberta

52. Montreal Alouettes  Rick Griffiths         C                    Wilfrid Laurier

53. Edmonton Eskimos                              Stuart Lang           WR                   Queen's

54. Ottawa Rough Riders                           Jeff Cope              DB                   Simon Fraser

7th round

55. Winnipeg Blue Bombers                         Rick Howse             FB                   Waterloo

56. Hamilton Tiger-Cats                           Dave Lane  DB  Guelph

57. Calgary Stampeders                            Ron Southwick          DE                   McMaster

58. British Columbia Lions  Charlie Campbell       DE                   Simon Fraser

59. Toronto Argonauts                             Bob Spree              QB                   Waterloo

60. Hamilton Tiger-Cats                           Doug Ward  DB  York

61. Montreal Alouettes                            Jim Boltin             LB                   Otterbein

62. Edmonton Eskimos                              Neil Falkeid           T                    Alberta

63. Ottawa Rough Riders                           Doug Ridding           LB                   Otterbein

8th round
64. Winnipeg Blue Bombers                         Carl Knovac  DE  Bridgeport

65. Hamilton Tiger-Cats                           Jamie Porteous  DB  New Brunswick

66. Calgary Stampeders                            Bruce Morris           HB              Guelph

67. British Columbia Lions                        Bob Osness             E               Augsburg

68. Toronto Argonauts  John Wintermeyer       TB              Queen's

69. Hamilton Tiger-Cats  Dave Lawson            QB              McMaster

70. Montreal Alouettes  Howard Hills           WR              Acadia

71. Edmonton Eskimos                              Tony Pugliese          LB              Alberta

9th round
72. Winnipeg Blue Bombers                         John Malus             DE              Manitoba

73. Hamilton Tiger-Cats                           Dave Hutton            LB              Guelph

74. Calgary Stampeders                            Art Carefoote          T               Guelph

75. British Columbia Lions                        Mike Lapensee  K  Loyola

76. Toronto Argonauts  Tom Graham             C               Guelph

77. Hamilton Tiger-Cats                           Craig Holt             WR              Guelph

78. Montreal Alouettes                            Terry Clement  LB  Eastern Washington

79. Edmonton Eskimos                              Blake Walker           G               Saskatchewan

References
Canadian Draft

Canadian College Draft
Cfl Draft, 1974